Aleksandr Viktorovich Zakharov (born 11 August 1969) is a former Soviet and Russian professional footballer.

Club career
He made his debut in the Soviet Top League in 1990 for FC Dynamo Moscow.

Honours
 Soviet Top League bronze: 1990.
 Ukrainian Premier League silver: 1993.
 Ukrainian Premier League bronze: 1992.

References

1969 births
Living people
Sportspeople from Kursk
Soviet footballers
Russian footballers
Association football midfielders
Russian expatriate footballers
Expatriate footballers in Ukraine
Russian expatriate sportspeople in Ukraine
Expatriate footballers in Belarus
Expatriate footballers in Israel
Soviet Top League players
Ukrainian Premier League players
FC Kristall Smolensk players
FC Dynamo Moscow players
FC Dnipro players
FC Kryvbas Kryvyi Rih players
Hapoel Be'er Sheva F.C. players
FC Torpedo Minsk players
FC Torpedo Zaporizhzhia players
FC Iskra Smolensk players